The Under-Secretary of State for Air was a junior ministerial post in the United Kingdom Government, supporting the Secretary of State for Air in his role of managing the Royal Air Force. It was established on 10 January 1919, replacing the previous short-lived posts of Parliamentary Secretary to the Air Board and Parliamentary Secretary to the Air Council.

Parliamentary Secretary to the Air Board, 1916–1917

Parliamentary Secretary to the Air Council, 1917–1919

Under-Secretary of State for Air, 1919–1964

Minister of State for the Air Force, 1964–1967

Under-Secretary of State for the Air Force, 1964–1981

Sources

D. Butler and G. Butler, Twentieth Century British Political Facts 1900–2000

Air, Under-Secretary of State for
Defunct ministerial offices in the United Kingdom
Royal Air Force